The Moonraker is a British swashbuckler film made in 1957 and released in 1958 and set in the English Civil War. It was directed by David MacDonald and starred George Baker, Sylvia Syms, Marius Goring, Gary Raymond, Peter Arne, John Le Mesurier and Patrick Troughton. It is based on the 1952 play of the same title by Arthur Watkyn. It was shot at Elstree Studios with sets designed by the art director Robert Jones

The film depicts a fictionalised account of the escape of Charles II, arranged by a foppish royalist nobleman, the Earl of Dawlish, who leads a double life as a roundhead-baiting highwayman called The Moonraker, who already has helped more than thirty royalists to escape to France.

The film was one of the last productions made by the Robert Clarke regime at Associated British-Pathe.

Synopsis
After the Battle of Worcester at the end of the Second English Civil War, the main aim of General Oliver Cromwell (John Le Mesurier) is to capture Charles Stuart (Gary Raymond), son of the executed Charles I. However, the dashing Royalist hero nicknamed The Moonraker (George Baker) prepares to smuggle him to safety into France, under the noses of Cromwell's soldiers. According to the story, the hero is named after the smuggler term, Moonrakers, who were reputed to hide contraband in the village pond and to rake it out by moonlight.

Cast
 George Baker as the Moonraker, otherwise Anthony, Earl of Dawlish 
 Sylvia Syms as Anne Wyndham 
 Marius Goring as Colonel Beaumont 
 Peter Arne as Edmund Tyler 
 Clive Morton as Lord Harcourt 
 Gary Raymond as Charles Stuart 
 Richard Leech as Henry Strangeways 
 Iris Russell as Judith Strangeways 
 Michael Anderson Jr. as Martin Strangeways
 Paul Whitsun-Jones as Parfitt 
 John Le Mesurier as Oliver Cromwell 
 Patrick Troughton as Captain Wilcox 
 Julian Somers as Captain Foster 
 Sylvia Bidmead as Meg 
 Patrick Waddington as Lord Dorset
 Fanny Rowe as Lady Dorset
 Jennifer Browne as Henrietta Dorset 
 Richard Warner as Trooper 
 George Woodbridge as Captain Lowry
 Victor Brooks as Blacksmith

Production
The film was based on a play by Arthur Watkyn, who was the British film censor. The play debuted in 1952, starring Griffith Jones and Jean Kent. The Manchester Guardian called it "a disarming and naive piece... of dramatic tushery."

In February 1952 Robert Clark of Associated British proposed that his company purchase the film rights as a vehicle for Audrey Hepburn, who they had under contract, and either David Niven or Cornel Wilde. Associated British had an arrangement with Warner Bros; Jack Warner liked the story and agreed to a co production starring Hepburn and Wilde.

The play had been very successful in the provinces, so Watkyn wanted £10,000 for the film rights; neither Clark nor Warner would pay this, so Watkyn refused to sell until the play opened in London. When it did, it was a box office disaster and only lasted four performances. Watkyn agreed to sell the rights. However the film was not made with Hepburn.

The film was eventually made several years later. It was one of the last film Clark green-lit while head of the company and he is credited as "director of production". According to one writer, "this was an unusual occurrence for Clark, and indicates his intense interest in the project. And indeed The Moonraker should be interpreted as Clark's 'last stand' on politics and film culture. Rather than display a preference for the attractive and swashbuckling Cavaliers (as is so often evident in British popular culture), Clark's film takes care to establish the moral superiority of the Roundheads. Its soldiery are on the whole presented as moral men convinced of the probity of their cause, and Cromwell (John Le Mesurier) is a dignified and balanced leader. Clark clearly favoured an interpretation of history which presented Puritanism as more sober and even-handed than its alternative."

The film was shot at Boreham Wood with location filming at Dorset, Wiltshire and Hertfordshire. Sylvia Syms and Peter Arne were under long-term contract to ABPC at the time.

George Baker said he "enjoyed making The Moonraker very much" adding:
I actually wrote quite a lot of it. A couple of the love scenes with Sylvia were entirely my work... The film is always popular on television. David Macdonald, who directed it, was unfortunately a bit of a lush, and it was almost his last film. When we got the script he went through it with us, saying, ‘Here you don’t “walk” across the room — you either “jump” or “swing” across but you don’t “walk”. And this twelve lines of dialogue is absolutely useless, we can cut it down to a few words.’ He did this all the way through, so it’s absolutely an action film. 
Sylvia Syms called the film "for its time it’s quite sweet... compared with some of the costume dramas coming out of Hollywood at that time, at least we looked right for the period. I had correct hair styling, covered with the modest lace cap, and the costumes were authentic. I liked working with George Baker... And, of course, Max Greene always made me look beautiful."

Reception

Critical
The Monthly Film Bulletin said that "on its chosen level, which is that of boys' romantic yarn, this film may be said to succeed. It moves at such a breathless rate that many of its probabilities go unremarked."

Variety called it "a routine costume meller." Filmink said the film "has too many cast members who look like George Baker but is quite lovely with terrific colour."

Box office
Kinematograph Weekly listed it as being "in the money" at the British box office in 1958.

Notes

References

External links

The Moonraker at BFI
The Moonraker at Letterbox DVD

1958 films
1958 drama films
1950s historical films
British adventure films
British historical films
British drama films
English Civil War films
Films directed by David MacDonald (director)
Films scored by Laurie Johnson
Films shot at Associated British Studios
British swashbuckler films
Cultural depictions of Oliver Cromwell
Cultural depictions of Charles II of England
British films based on plays
1950s English-language films
1950s British films